The term rolling stock in the rail transport industry refers to railway vehicles, including both powered and unpowered vehicles: for example, locomotives, freight and passenger cars (or coaches), and non-revenue cars. Passenger vehicles can be un-powered, or self-propelled, single or multiple units. A connected series of railway vehicles is a train (this term applied to a locomotive is a common misnomer).

In North America, Australia and other countries, the term consist is used to refer to the rolling stock in a train.

In the United States, the term rolling stock has been expanded from the older broadly defined "trains" to include wheeled vehicles used by businesses on roadways.

The word stock in the term is used in a sense of inventory. Rolling stock is considered to be a liquid asset, or close to it, since the value of the vehicle can be readily estimated and then shipped to the buyer without much cost or delay. The term contrasts with fixed stock (infrastructure), which is a collective term for the track, signals, stations, other buildings, electric wires, etc., necessary to operate a railway.

Gallery

See also

 Goods wagon
List of railway vehicles
 Railroad car

References

External links

 
Rail transport